Sfitakantha is a genus of beetles in the family Carabidae, containing the following species:

 Sfitakantha impressa (Schmidt-Goebel, 1846)
 Sfitakantha reflexa Andrewes, 1937

References

Lebiinae